The Fairbanks Grizzlies were a professional indoor football team based in Fairbanks, Alaska. The team was a member of the Pacific Division of the Intense Conference in the Indoor Football League (IFL). The Grizzlies began play in 2008 as a member of the Intense Football League and joined the IFL in 2008 as part of the Intense Football League and United Indoor Football (UIF) merger. The team played their home games at the Carlson Center in Fairbanks.

The Grizzlies were notable for being the northernmost professional gridiron football team in history; the Alaska Wild held the previous record, and before that, the Edmonton Eskimos. Grizzlies games were broadcast live on KCBF. (The northernmost gridiron football team of any sort is the high school football team of Barrow High School.)

The Grizzlies suspended operations in October 2011 in the face of lawsuits against the team.

Season-by-season

|-
| colspan="6" style="text-align:center;"| Fairbanks Grizzlies (Intense Football League)
|-
|2008 || 3 || 11 || 0 || 9th League || --
|-
| colspan="6" style="text-align:center;"| Fairbanks Grizzlies (Indoor Football League)
|-
|2009 || 7 || 7 || 0 || 2nd Intense Pacific || Won Divisionals I (Colorado)Lost Divisionals II (Billings)
|-
|2010 || 9 || 5 || 0 || 2nd Pacific North || Lost First Round (Billings)
|-
|2011 || 10 || 4 || 0 || 1st Pacific || Lost Conference Semi-Final (Allen)
|-
!Totals || 30 || 30 || 0
|colspan="2"| (including playoffs)

Final roster

References

External links

 

 
2007 establishments in Alaska
2011 disestablishments in Alaska